Gautier-Languereau is a French publishing house, founded by Maurice Languereau and Henri Gautier, and currently owned by Hachette Livre, and used as an imprint for children's literature.

History
Founded in 1859 as Gautier, the company was renamed Gautier-Languereau in 1917 when Maurice Languereau became full partner with his uncle Henri Gautier. They specialized in children's books and magazines and religious literature. Their biggest success came with the weekly magazine for girls La Semaine de Suzette, published from 1905, and its flagship comic, Bécassine. The first Bécassine books appeared in 1913. From that year on, the stories were written by Languereau. 

In 1991, the company was acquired by Hachette.

Book series
 Les albums de Bécassine
 Albums merveilleux (1961-1965)
 Au Fil de la vie
 Les Bêtes chez elles
 Bibliothèque bleue
 Bibliothèque de ma fille
 Bibliothèque des petites sources de richesse
 Bibliothèque de Suzette (1919-1958) - novels for girls
 Collection Delly
 Collection Fontanille
 Collection Jean-François (1950-1960) - novels for boys
 Des ouvrages de vie pratique
 Familia
 Les Histoires de Bécassine
 Histoires de tableaux
 Je lis tout seul
 Jeunes bibliophiles
 Livres à lire, livres à jouer
 Les Mémoires de Bécassine
 Les nouveaux bibliophiles
 Nouvelle bibliothèque de Suzette
 Les petits Gautier
 Pitchoun
 Premiers Albums (1980-1992)
 Premiers Livres (1972-1985)
 Les quatres saisons
 Romans à lire
 Scènes et tableaux
 Les Secrets du pirate
 Série 15
 Sur les pas de...
 L'Univers en couleurs

Notes

External links
 

Book publishing companies of France
Lagardère Media